James Munroe Aitken (15 May 1872 – 27 August 1944) was an Australian rules footballer who played in the Victorian Football League (VFL).

Aitken was Carlton's inaugural VFL captain when the league formed for the 1897 season, replacing Tom Blake. He had been the club's vice-captain the previous season when they competed in the Victorian Football Association (VFA), and was elected captain before the start of the season, with a twelve to eight majority vote. After a disappointing run of form, just making the side to play against South Melbourne and Melbourne, he was left out of the team and replaced by Ernie Walton. Aitken left the Blues midway through the 1898 season and joined Melbourne. He played four games for Melbourne before leaving the game. He was the first player in the VFL to play senior premiership matches for two clubs in the same season.

References

External links

Jimmy Aitken at Blueseum

DemonWiki profile

1872 births
1944 deaths
Carlton Football Club (VFA) players
Carlton Football Club players
Melbourne Football Club players
Australian rules footballers from Ballarat